"Mon âme" is a song by French hip hop artist Nekfeu featuring his 1995 colleague Sneazzy. It is the second track from Nekfeu's debut studio album Feu and is produced by himself and DJ Elite.

The song entered the French Singles Chart at number 152 on 20 June 2015, where it has since peaked, despite not being officially released as a single.

Track listing
 Digital download
 "Mon âme (featuring Sneazzy)" – 4:26

Chart performance

References

2015 songs
Nekfeu songs
French hip hop songs
Songs written by Nekfeu